Arij Smit (7 July 1907 – 30 April 1970) was a Dutch boxer who competed in the 1924 Summer Olympics. He was born in Schiedam and died in Haarlem. In 1924 he was eliminated in the second round of the bantamweight class after losing his fight to Alf Barber of Great Britain.

References

External links
Olympic profile

The last unknown Dutch competitor 
Video 
Story on sportgeschiedenis 

1907 births
1970 deaths
Bantamweight boxers
Olympic boxers of the Netherlands
Boxers at the 1924 Summer Olympics
Sportspeople from Schiedam
Dutch male boxers